Liebigite is a uranium carbonate mineral with the chemical formula: Ca2(UO2)(CO3)3·11H2O. It is a secondary mineral occurring in the oxidizing zone of uranium-bearing ores. It is green to yellow green in colour.  It has a Mohs hardness of about 3. Liebigite, like some other uranium minerals, is fluorescent under UV light and is also translucent. It crystallizes in the orthorhombic system, but only rarely forms distinct crystals. It typically forms encrustations or granular aggregates.

It was first described in 1848 for an occurrence in Adrianople, Edirne Province, Marmara Region, Turkey.  It was named for German chemist Justus von Liebig (1803–1873).

References

Carbonate minerals
Uranium(VI) minerals
Orthorhombic minerals
Minerals in space group 41
Justus von Liebig